Alexis le Breton (born 14 August 1985) is a South African cricketer who currently plays for Western Province as a right-handed batter. She appeared in 6 One Day Internationals and 5 Twenty20 Internationals for South Africa in 2013.

References

External links
 
 

1985 births
Living people
South African women cricketers
South Africa women One Day International cricketers
South Africa women Twenty20 International cricketers
Western Province women cricketers
West Coast women cricketers